Apostolis Anthimos (born 25 September 1954 in Siemianowice Śląskie) is a Polish jazz / rock oriented guitarist, drummer and keyboard player. His parents are Greeks.
He is a member of the Polish progressive rock band SBB, and has had a long individual career both as band leader and as sideman.

He has co-operated with Czesław Niemen, Tomasz Stańko, George Dalaras, Vangelis Katsoulis, and also a number of bands, including Krzak, Dżem and Osjan. He has participated in the recording of over fifty albums, including three solo albums of his own: Days We Can't Forget (1994, backed by Gil Goldstein, Jim Beard, Matthew Garrison & Paul Wertico), Theatro (1999) and Back to the North (2006, backed by Wertico and Marcin Pospieszalski).

His recent solo projects include:

 Apostolis Anthimos Trio (with Krzysztof Dziedzic on drums and Robert Szewczuga on bass guitar)
 Apostolis Anthimos Quartet (with Arild Andersen on double bass, Tomasz Szukalski on saxophone and Krzysztof Dziedzic on drums)

External links
Apostolis Anthimos' official web page
Apostolis' page on MySpace.Com

1954 births
Living people
Polish drummers
Male drummers
Polish jazz guitarists
People from Siemianowice Śląskie
Polish people of Greek descent
Male jazz musicians
Polish male guitarists